Constitutional Revolution may refer to:

Constitutional Revolution (Israel), legislation passed by the Israeli Knesset from 1992-1995 on human rights and the basis of the Supreme Court's powers of judicial review
Persian Constitutional Revolution, the revolution in Persia (Iran) between 1905 and 1911 that led to the establishment of a parliament during the Qajar dynasty

See also 
 Constitutionalist Revolution of 1932, the uprising of the population of the Brazilian state of São Paulo against the Brazilian Revolution of 1930

Disambiguation pages